Fiumicello Villa Vicentina is a comune in the Province of Udine in the Italian region Friuli-Venezia Giulia.

It was established on 1 February 2018 by the merger of Fiumicello and Villa Vicentina.

References

Cities and towns in Friuli-Venezia Giulia